Stairs to Noise is an EP by alternative rock band The Xcerts . The EP consists of five songs plus two bonus tracks and also features a cover of Say Yes by Elliott Smith.

Track listing

Personnel
 Murray Macleod – guitar, vocals
 Jordan Smith – bass guitar, vocals, piano
 Tom Heron – drums, percussion, vocals

References

Xtra Mile Recordings albums
2011 EPs
The Xcerts albums